Harry J. Donnelly (June 24, 1922 – May 20, 1989) was an American politician who served in the New York State Assembly from Kings's 3rd district from 1957 to 1960 and in the New York City Council from Brooklyn's at-large district from 1964 to 1966.

A resident of Breezy Point, Queens, he died of cancer on May 20, 1989, in Manhattan, New York City, New York at age 66.

References

1922 births
1989 deaths
Republican Party members of the New York State Assembly
New York City Council members
20th-century American politicians